Lakshmi Sahgal (born Lakshmi Swaminathan; 24 October 1914 – 23 July 2012) was a revolutionary of the Indian independence movement, an officer of the Indian National Army, and the Minister of Women's Affairs in the Azad Hind government. Lakshmi is commonly referred to in India as Captain Lakshmi, a reference to her rank when taken prisoner in Burma during the Second World War.

Early life

Captain Lakshmi was born to a Tamil brahmin father and Malayali Nair (Menon) mother as Lakshmi Swaminathan in Madras on 24 October 1914 to S. Swaminathan, a lawyer who practiced criminal law at Madras High Court, and A.V. Ammukutty, better known as Ammu Swaminathan, a social worker and independence activist from an aristocratic Nair family known as "Vadakkath" family of Anakkara, Ponnani taluk, Malabar District, British India. She is the elder sister of Mrinalini Sarabhai.

Lakshmi studied in Queen Mary's College and later chose to study medicine and received an MBBS degree from Madras Medical College in 1938. A year later, she received her diploma in gynaecology and obstetrics. She worked as a doctor in the Government Kasturba Gandhi Hospital located at Triplicane Chennai.

In 1940, she left for Singapore after the failure of her marriage to pilot P.K.N. Rao.  During her stay at Singapore, she met some members of Subhas Chandra Bose's Indian National Army.

The Azad Hind Fauj
In 1942, during the surrender of Singapore by the British to the Japanese, Lakshmi aided wounded prisoners of war, many of whom were interested in forming an Indian independence army. Singapore at this time had several nationalist Indians working there including K. P. Kesava Menon, S. C. Guha and N. Raghavan, who formed a Council of Action. Their Indian National Army, or Azad Hind Fauj, however, received no firm commitments or approval from the occupying Japanese forces regarding their participation in the war.

It was against this backdrop that Subhas Chandra Bose arrived in Singapore on 2 July 1943. Lakshmi had heard that Bose was keen to draft women into the organisation and requested a meeting with him from which she emerged with a mandate to set up a women's regiment, to be called the Rani of Jhansi regiment. Women responded enthusiastically to join the all-women brigade and Dr. Lakshmi Swaminathan became Captain Lakshmi, a name and identity that would stay with her for life.

The INA marched to Burma with the Japanese army in December 1944, but by March 1945, with the tide of war turning against them, the INA leadership decided to beat a retreat before they could enter Imphal. Captain Lakshmi was arrested by the British in May 1945, remaining in Burma until March 1946, when she was sent to India – at a time when the INA trials in Delhi heightened popular discontent with and hastened the end of colonial rule.

Later years
In 1971, Lakshmi joined the Communist Party of India (Marxist) and represented the party in the Rajya Sabha. During the Bangladesh crisis, she organised relief camps and medical aid in Calcutta for refugees who streamed into India from Bangladesh. She was one of the founding members of All India Democratic Women's Association in 1981 and led many of its activities and campaigns. She led a medical team to Bhopal after the gas tragedy in December 1984, worked towards restoring peace in Kanpur following the anti-Sikh riots of 1984 and was arrested for her participation in a campaign against the Miss World competition in Bangalore in 1996.  She was still seeing patients regularly at her clinic in Kanpur in 2006, at the age of 92.

In 2002, four leftist partiesthe Communist Party of India, the Communist Party of India (Marxist), the Revolutionary Socialist Party, and the All India Forward Blocnominated Sahgal as a candidate in the presidential elections. She was the sole opponent of A.P.J. Abdul Kalam, who emerged victorious.

Personal life
Lakshmi married Prem Kumar Sahgal in March 1947 in Lahore. After their marriage, they settled in Kanpur, where she continued with her medical practice and aided the refugees who were arriving in large numbers following the Partition of India. They had two daughters: Subhashini Ali and Anisa Puri.

Subhashini is a prominent communist politician and labour activist. According to Ali, Lakshmi was an atheist. The filmmaker Shaad Ali is her grandson.

Death
On 19 July 2012, Sahgal had a cardiac arrest and died on 23 July 2012 at 11:20 A.M. at the age of 97 at Kanpur. Her body was donated to Ganesh Shankar Vidyarthi Memorial Medical College for medical research.

Awards
In 1998, Sahgal was awarded the Padma Vibhushan by Indian president K. R. Narayanan. In 2010, she was bestowed with honorary doctorate by University of Calicut.

See also
 Indian National Army
 Janaky Athi Nahappan
 Rasammah Bhupalan
 Ethnic communities in Kanpur

References

Subhashini Ali Lakshmi Sahgal: A life in service
Indra Guptha India's 50 Most Illustrious Women 
Peter Fay The Forgotten Army: India's Armed Struggle for Independence, 1942-1945

External links

 Lakshmi Sehgal: A life of struggle and sacrifice - by Sambhavika Sharma
 Rediff interview 2002
 The Pioneers: The Pioneers: Dr. Lakshmi Sehgal
 Indian Express Interview: Despite differences, India is one: Captain Laxmi Sehgal
 Freedom fighter Captain Lakshmi Sahgal dies , NDTV
 Captain Lakshmi, The Economist, 4 August 2012

1914 births
2012 deaths
Indian atheists
Indian revolutionaries
Recipients of the Padma Vibhushan in public affairs
Azad Hind
Indian National Army personnel
People from Kanpur
Indian independence movement
Indian independence activists from Tamil Nadu
Indian communists
Indian rebels
Subhas Chandra Bose
Madras Medical College alumni
Candidates for President of India
Indian gynaecologists
Indian women gynaecologists
20th-century Indian women scientists
21st-century Indian women scientists
20th-century Indian medical doctors
Indian women of World War II
Women scientists from Uttar Pradesh
21st-century Indian medical doctors
Medical doctors from Tamil Nadu
Women scientists from Tamil Nadu
Medical doctors from Uttar Pradesh
20th-century women physicians
21st-century women physicians
Female revolutionaries